Mary N. Carrington is an American immunologist researching the role of host genetics in cancer, autoimmunity and infectious disease pathogenesis. She is director of the basic science program at the Frederick National Laboratory for Cancer Research.

Education 
Carrington graduated from University of Kansas with a B.S. in education, later obtaining her M.S. and Ph.D. in immunobiology from Iowa State University. She performed her postdoctoral studies in the departments of Immunology and Microbiology at Duke University and the University of North Carolina.

Career and research 
Carrington joined the immunology department at Duke University as a faculty member. She moved to the National Cancer Institute at Frederick in 1989. Carrington is the director of the Basic Science Program at the Frederick National Laboratory for Cancer Research, where she is responsible for the guidance and oversight of a large, diverse group of scientists performing investigator-initiated, hypothesis-driven basic research in cancer and AIDS. She is also a senior principal scientist at the National Cancer Institute and heads the Human Leukocyite Antigens Immunogenetics Laboratory in the Cancer and Inflammation Program. Her primary research interests focus on the role of host genetics in cancer, autoimmunity and infectious disease pathogenesis. Her group studies the influence of immunogenetic variation on risk of human disease, outcome to therapeutic treatment, and vaccination. These studies include elucidation of the functional basis for the genetic associations identified. In 2022, she was elected to the American Academy of Arts and Sciences.

References 

Living people
Year of birth missing (living people)
Place of birth missing (living people)
American immunologists
Women immunologists
20th-century American women scientists
21st-century American women scientists
20th-century American biologists
21st-century American biologists
American medical researchers
Women medical researchers
University of Kansas alumni
Iowa State University alumni
Duke University faculty
National Institutes of Health people
Fellows of the American Academy of Microbiology
American women academics
Fellows of the American Academy of Arts and Sciences